Errol Clince (16 February 1953 – 8 September 2014) was a New Zealand professional hunter and self-taught engineer. He is most well known for his discovery of the wreckage of a Royal New Zealand Air Force Airspeed Oxford, ending a 32-year New Zealand aviation mystery.

Clince was born in 1953 in Eltham, Taranaki. A keen hunter from an early age, Clince left Stratford High School at 18 years and took up a job with the New Zealand Forest Service as a varmint exterminator. He was tasked hunting goats on Mt. Taranaki (then Mt. Egmont) and surrounding National Park. He also had a stint as an exterminator on Raoul Island. He has been credited with over 5000 confirmed kills over his 16 year career as a professional hunter. An expert on both the local geography and varmint, Clince assisted with various technical reports and academic studies relating to the area. Following his work with the NZ Forest Service, Clince worked as a caretaker for the Stratford Mountain House on the eastern slopes of Mt Taranaki.

Clince is most well-known for the discovery of an RNZAF Airspeed Oxford twin engine bomber-training aircraft wreckage on the slopes of Mt Taranaki. The aircraft, an Oxford I, NZ277/P2030 with Pilot Officer Rodney Dandy and crew Sgt Douglas Martyn, Sgt Graham Martin and Sgt Edward Dodson, departed Bell Block Airfield, New Plymouth on 23 October 1942 on a training mission. It is assumed that due to heavy cloud, the crew made navigational errors which resulted in a crash at 4,000 feet. No crew members survived. The RNZAF and local authorities discontinued searches for the aircraft after three months. 32 years later on 15 January 1974 Clince discovered the crash site. Assuming it was already documented, Clince messed around with the wreckage including tampering with the controls and .303 machine gun. He was alerted to the presence of human remains by his dog who had recovered a bone. He then made a hasty retreat down the mountain to inform the Police. He returned shortly after with a party of Police, NZRAF and media. His diary noted:Hunted Mangorei Stream, got 10 goats. Got a ride in a Cortina 2000 Automatic. Found old bomber below Mangorei Hut somewhere. There were a lot of 303 bullet shells, a machinegun and an old parachute still not undone ... I also found the leg bone of a human then I buggered off from there fast.Errol was also well-known locally for his engineering projects. He forged numerous black-powder cannons, which were often wheeled out at local events, and for building two gyro-copters in which he clocked over 300 flying-hours over Taranaki and Manawatū-Whanganui Regions.

Clince died peacefully on 8 September 2014 after a short battle with cancer.

References

1953 births
2014 deaths
New Zealand hunters
New Zealand engineers